The 2006 Hong Kong Open in badminton was held from August 28 to September 2.

Results

Men's singles

Women's singles

External links
Official website of Hong Kong Badminton Association
Results

Hong Kong Open (badminton)
Hong Kong Open
Open (badminton)